= Academic ranks in Jordan =

National set of academic ranks

Academic ranks in Jordan are the titles, relative importance and power of professors, researchers, and administrative personnel held in academia.

== Overview ==
- Professor (أستاذ)
- Associate professor (أستاذ مشارك)
- Assistant professor (أستاذ مساعد)
- Practitioner Professor (أستاذ ممارس)
- Lecturer (مدرس)
- Assistant lecturer (مدرس مساعد )

== Professorship ==
Universities in Jordan borrow from the US higher education system. Whether public or private, universities have five ranks for faculty members: مدرس مساعد (Mudarris musā`id; equivalent to teaching assistant), مدرس(Mudarris; equivalent to senior teaching assistant), (Ustāḏ musā`id; equivalent to assistant professor), أستاذ مساعد(Ustāḏ musharik; equivalent to associate professor), and أستاذ('Ustāḏ; equivalent to professor)

Teaching assistant: A teaching assistant must have a master's degree before commencing employment. The duties include preparing and delivering tutorial and lab sessions, preparing assignments and term projects requirements, preparing and conducting laboratory examinations, and tutorial quizzes, and co-supervising graduation projects.

Senior teaching assistant: After a teaching assistant hired, s/he is promoted to a senior teaching assistant after submission to two accepted papers for publication. Usually, the duties do not change, but the salary increases slightly.

Assistant professor: doctorate equivalent holders can be hired as an assistant professor, and receives tenureship. Assistant professors duties include delivering lectures, supervising graduation projects, master's theses, and doctoral dissertations.

Associate professor: After at least five years, an assistant professor can apply for a promotion to the rank of associate professor. The decision is based on the scholarly contributions of the applicant, in terms of publications and theses and dissertations supervised.

Professor: After at least five years, an associate professor can apply for a promotion to the rank of a professor. The decision is based on the scholarly contributions of the applicant, in terms of publications and theses and dissertations supervised.

Academic duties of associate professors and professors are nearly the same as assistant professors. However, only associate professors and professors can assume senior administrative posts like a department chair, a college vice dean, and a college dean.
